Datla Balaramaraju (1907-1998) was an Indian politician. He was a member of parliament, representing Narasapuram in the Lok Sabha, the lower house of India's Parliament, as a member of the Indian National Congress.

References

External links
Official biographical sketch in Parliament of India website

Lok Sabha members from Andhra Pradesh
Indian National Congress politicians
India MPs 1967–1970
India MPs 1962–1967
1907 births
1998 deaths